Tavus Darrehsi (also Romanized as Ţāvūs Darrehsī; also known as Ţāvos Darrehsī) is a village in Pain Barzand Rural District, Anguti District, Germi County, Ardabil Province, Iran. At the 2006 census, its population was 175, in 35 families.

References 

Towns and villages in Germi County